Oskie may refer to:

 nickname of Gordon Slade (1904–1974), American Major League Baseball player
 Jimmy Oskie, American race car driver - see List of National Sprint Car Hall of Fame inductees
 Oscar the Grouch, a character on the children's television series Sesame Street, called Oskie by his girlfriend Grundgetta

See also
 Oskie presentation, a type of cephalic presentation in childbirth
 Osky, nickname of Oskaloosa, Iowa, an American city
 Ousmane Osky, Guinean footballer - see 2019 Africa U-17 Cup of Nations squads
 Oscy, a character in the 1971 film Summer of '42